Medford is a township in Burlington County, in the U.S. state of New Jersey. As of the 2020 United States census, the township's population was 24,497, an increase of 1,464 (+6.4%) from the 2010 census count of 23,033, which in turn reflected an increase of 780 (+3.5%) from the 22,253 counted in the 2000 census.

Medford was incorporated as a township by an act of the New Jersey Legislature on March 1, 1847, from portions of Evesham Township, based on the results of a referendum held that day. Portions of the township were taken to form Shamong Township (February 19, 1852), Lumberton (March 14, 1860), and Medford Lakes (May 17, 1939). The township is part of the South Jersey region of the state.

History
European settlement in the area that is now Medford began when  of land was sold to Samuel Coles in 1670. Within the next few years, the Braddock, Prickett, Stratton, Branin, and Wilkins families moved to the area (many of whom continue to live in the area today). Upper Evesham, as it was then known, continued to grow from scattered homesteads into a small village. Many of the buildings and roads built between the sale of the land and the American Revolutionary War are still in existence, including Oliphant's Mill, Christopher's Mill, and the Shamong Trail (now known as Stokes Road).

In 1820, when the post office opened, the area was officially called Medford of Upper Evesham, using a name that had been pushed by Mark Reeve, a developer who had recently visited Medford, Massachusetts. On March 1, 1847, Medford Township was "set apart from" Evesham Township by Act of the New Jersey Legislature. The first township meeting was held at the Cross Roads (County Route 541 and Church Road) on March 9, 1847. The seat of township government remained there for several years. Part of Medford Township was taken on February 19, 1852, to form Shamong Township. On March 14, 1860, portions were taken to form Lumberton. The borders remained unchanged until May 17, 1939, when Medford Lakes was formed.

A thriving glass-making industry developed in Medford as early as 1825 with a glass-making furnace that manufactured window panes. By 1850, William Porter was operating a glass factory on a triangle of property formed by South Main Street, Mill Street, and Trimble Street. Glass-making operations continued on the property throughout the 1880s under company names including Medford Glass Works and Star Glass, which at its peak employed about 250 workers and built up a "company town" of sorts with houses for owners and managers and housing for workers. A company store enabled workers to exchange scrip for food and necessities. Glass-making operations ended around 1925, and the factory was torn down by the mid-1940s. Today, many of the nearly 30 workers' homes are neatly kept on Trimble and Mill Streets, as well as the owners' / managers' residence at 126 South Main Street and the company store at 132 South Main Street.

Dr. James Still (1812–1882), a self-educated African-American physician known as "the Black Doctor of the Pines," lived and treated patients in Medford. Dr. Still's home was torn down in 1932, but his remaining office building was purchased for preservation by the State of New Jersey in 2006. Today it is the Dr. James Still Historic Office Site and Education Center.

Medford's location along the Camden and Atlantic Railroad increased trade, and Medford expanded rapidly in the years after the Civil War. By the 1920s, the rail line had been dismantled, and the mill industry was in decline. Still, Medford's proximity to Philadelphia and Camden County allowed the township's growth to continue as many families moved from the city to a more rural area.

Geography
According to the U.S. Census Bureau, the township had a total area of 39.81 square miles (103.10 km2), including 38.80 square miles (100.49 km2) of land and 1.01 square miles (2.61 km2) of water (2.53%). Unincorporated communities, localities, and place names located partially or completely within the township include Birchwood Lakes, Braddocks Mill, Chairville, Christopher Mills, Crossroads, Fairview, Kirbys Mill, Medford Lakes in the Pines, Melrose, Oak Knoll, Oakanickon, Oliphants Mills, Pipers Corners, Reeves, Taunton, Taunton Lake, and Wilkins.

The township is one of 56 South Jersey municipalities that are included within the New Jersey Pinelands National Reserve, a protected natural area of unique ecology covering , that has been classified as a United States Biosphere Reserve and established by Congress in 1978 as the nation's first National Reserve. Part of the township is included in the state-designated Pinelands Area, which includes portions of Burlington County, along with areas in Atlantic, Camden, Cape May, Cumberland, Gloucester, and Ocean counties.

Medford Lakes is an independent municipality encircled within the boundaries of Medford Township, making it half one of 21 pairs of "doughnut towns" in the state, where one municipality entirely surrounds another. The township borders Evesham Township (which includes Marlton), Lumberton, Mount Laurel Township, Shamong Township, Southampton Township, Tabernacle Township in Burlington County; and Waterford Township in Camden County.

The climate of Medford Township is classified as humid continental, with cold winters, hot summers, and year-round humidity.

Demographics

2010 census

The Census Bureau's 2006–2010 American Community Survey showed that (in 2010 inflation-adjusted dollars) median household income was $107,883 (with a margin of error of +/− $5,728) and the median family income was $122,986 (+/− $5,037). Males had a median income of $82,169 (+/− $6,188) versus $58,324 (+/− $5,381) for females. The per capita income for the borough was $45,926 (+/− $2,571). About 0.8% of families and 1.9% of the population were below the poverty line, including 2.1% of those under age 18 and 1.5% of those age 65 or over.

2000 census
As of the 2000 U.S. census, there were 22,253 people, 7,946 households, and 6,285 families residing in the township. The racial makeup of the township was 96.74% White, 0.76% African American, 0.12% Native American, 1.47% Asian, 0.04% Pacific Islander, 0.28% from other races, and 0.59% from two or more races. Hispanic or Latino of any race were 1.13% of the population.

There were 7,946 households, out of which 38.3% had children under the age of 18 living with them, 70.8% were married couples living together, 6.4% had a female householder with no husband present, and 20.9% were non-families. 17.4% of all households were made up of individuals, and 7.6% had someone living alone who was 65 years of age or older.  The average household size was 2.77 and the average family size was 3.16.

In the township, the age distribution of the population shows 26.8% under the age of 18, 5.4% from 18 to 24, 26.7% from 25 to 44, 30.4% from 45 to 64, and 10.7% who were 65 years of age or older.  The median age was 40 years. For every 100 females, there were 93.9 males.  For every 100 females age 18 and over, there were 90.1 males.

The median income for a household in the township was $83,059, and the median income for a family was $97,135. Males had a median income of $69,786 versus $37,012 for females. The per capita income for the township was $38,641. About 0.9% of families and 1.9% of the population were below the poverty line, including 2.1% of those under age 18 and 2.2% of those age 65 or over.

Arts and culture
Brothers Charlie and Richie Ingui founded and sing with the R&B group Soul Survivors.

Parks and recreation 

 Woodford Cedar Run Wildlife Refuge is a  nature preserve and wildlife rehabilitation center located on the southern border of Medford and is open to the public.
 Freedom Park is a public park with extensive playground equipment, basketball and volleyball courts, bike paths, large pavilions, and large multipurpose fields, including a dog run.
 Kirby's Mill is a grist mill (flour mill) that has been added to the National Register of Historic Places.
 Medford Canoe Trail is a recently cleared canoe trail connecting Medford Park to Kirby's Mill.
 Historic Medford Village offers shopping, historic homes and an old-fashioned atmosphere, serving as the site of Medford's traditional Dickens Festival.
 JCC Camps at Medford near Medford Lakes is the largest Jewish day camp in North America, operating since 1942. Part of the Jewish Federation of Southern New Jersey, the camp is accredited by the American Camp Association. It accepts children as young as three years old, and campers come from all over the tri-county area (Camden, Burlington, and Gloucester counties).  Teenagers age 14 or older can join the leader-in-training program to become counselors, lifeguards, or specialists.  The camp offers a kosher lunch.  The camp is surrounded by the many lakes of Medford, located within the New Jersey Pine Barrens. The campsite has a  lake for boating and fishing and four in-ground pools for swimming.  There are four playgrounds, a petting zoo and several athletic fields, including tennis and hockey courts, and a ropes course.

Government

Local government 
Medford Township operates within the Faulkner Act (formally known as the Optional Municipal Charter Law) under the Council-Manager (Plan E) form of municipal government, implemented based on the recommendations of a Charter Study Commission as of January 1, 1980. The township is one of 42 municipalities (of the 564) statewide that use this form of government. The governing body is comprised of the five-member Council, whose members are elected at-large in partisan elections to staggered four-year terms of office as part of the November general election, with either two or three seats up for election in odd-numbered years. At a reorganization meeting held each January, the Council selects a Mayor and a Deputy Mayor from among its members.

Mayor Chris Myers resigned from the Township Council in December 2011, after it was disclosed that he had hired a male escort. He was replaced in January 2012 by Chuck Watson.

The township council selected Brad Denn in October 2014 from three candidates nominated by the Republican municipal committee to fill the vacant seat of James "Randy" Pace, who resigned from office after he moved out of state. Denn was elected to serve the remaining two years of office in November 2015.

In March 2019, Lauren Kochan was selected from three candidates nominated by the Republican municipal committee to fill the unexpired term of office ending in December 2019 that had been vacated the previous month by Chris Buoni, who announced that he was moving out of the township.

, members of the Medford Township Council are Mayor Charles "Chuck" J. Watson (R, term on council ends December 31, 2025; term as mayor ends 2022), Deputy Mayor Frank P. Czekay (R, term on council ends 2023; term as deputy mayor ends 2022), Lauren Kochan (R, 2023), Erik J. Rebstock (R, 2025) and Donna Symons (R, 2025).

Federal, state, and county representation 
Medford Township is located in the 3rd Congressional District and is part of New Jersey's 8th state legislative district.

 

Burlington County is governed by a Board of County Commissioners comprised of five members who are chosen at-large in partisan elections to serve three-year terms of office on a staggered basis, with either one or two seats coming up for election each year; at an annual reorganization meeting, the board selects a director and deputy director from among its members to serve a one-year term. , Burlington County's Commissioners are
Director Felicia Hopson (D, Willingboro Township, term as commissioner ends December 31, 2024; term as director ends 2023),
Deputy Director Tom Pullion (D, Edgewater Park, term as commissioner and as deputy director ends 2023),
Allison Eckel (D, Medford, 2025),
Daniel J. O'Connell (D, Delran Township, 2024) and 
Balvir Singh (D, Burlington Township, 2023). 
Burlington County's Constitutional Officers are
County Clerk Joanne Schwartz (R, Southampton Township, 2023)
Sheriff James H. Kostoplis (D, Bordentown, 2025) and 
Surrogate Brian J. Carlin (D, Burlington Township, 2026).

Politics
As of March 2011, there were a total of 16,632 registered voters in Medford Township, of which 3,893 (23.4% vs. 33.3% countywide) were registered as Democrats, 5,406 (32.5% vs. 23.9%) were registered as Republicans and 7,320 (44.0% vs. 42.8%) were registered as Unaffiliated. There were 13 voters registered as Libertarians or Greens. Among the township's 2010 Census population, 72.2% (vs. 61.7% in Burlington County) were registered to vote, including 97.7% of those ages 18 and over (vs. 80.3% countywide).

In the 2012 presidential election, Republican Mitt Romney received 7,499 votes here (55.8% vs. 40.2% countywide), ahead of Democrat Barack Obama with 5,747 votes (42.7% vs. 58.1%) and other candidates with 130 votes (1.0% vs. 1.0%), among the 13,451 ballots cast by the township's 17,574 registered voters, for a turnout of 76.5% (vs. 74.5% in Burlington County). In the 2008 presidential election, Republican John McCain received 7,049 votes here (52.3% vs. 39.9% countywide), ahead of Democrat Barack Obama with 6,214 votes (46.1% vs. 58.4%) and other candidates with 135 votes (1.0% vs. 1.0%), among the 13,466 ballots cast by the township's 16,535 registered voters, for a turnout of 81.4% (vs. 80.0% in Burlington County). In the 2004 presidential election, Republican George W. Bush received 7,615 votes here (57.4% vs. 46.0% countywide), ahead of Democrat John Kerry with 5,551 votes (41.8% vs. 52.9%) and other candidates with 78 votes (0.6% vs. 0.8%), among the 13,266 ballots cast by the township's 16,086 registered voters, for a turnout of 82.5% (vs. 78.8% in the whole county).

In the 2013 gubernatorial election, Republican Chris Christie received 5,628 votes here (71.0% vs. 61.4% countywide), ahead of Democrat Barbara Buono with 2,067 votes (26.1% vs. 35.8%) and other candidates with 107 votes (1.3% vs. 1.2%), among the 7,929 ballots cast by the township's 17,464 registered voters, yielding a 45.4% turnout (vs. 44.5% in the county). In the 2009 gubernatorial election, Republican Chris Christie received 5,371 votes here (60.1% vs. 47.7% countywide), ahead of Democrat Jon Corzine with 2,987 votes (33.4% vs. 44.5%), Independent Chris Daggett with 438 votes (4.9% vs. 4.8%) and other candidates with 83 votes (0.9% vs. 1.2%), among the 8,931 ballots cast by the township's 16,733 registered voters, yielding a 53.4% turnout (vs. 44.9% in the county).

Education
Medford Township Public Schools is a public school district that serves students in pre-kindergarten through eighth grade. The district has five elementary schools serving students in kindergarten through fifth grade, a single school serving sixth graders and a school serving seventh and eighth graders. As of the 2020–21 school year, the district, comprised of seven schools, had an enrollment of 2,517 students and 225.1 classroom teachers (on an FTE basis), for a student–teacher ratio of 11.2:1. Schools in the district (with 2020–21 enrollment data from the National Center for Education Statistics) are 
Milton H. Allen School with 399 students in grades K–5, Chairville Elementary School with 360 students in grades K–5, 
Cranberry Pines School with 365 students in grades K–5, 
Kirby's Mill Elementary School with 300 students in grades Pre-K–5, 
Taunton Forge School with 251 students in grades K–5, Maurice and Everett Haines Sixth Grade Center with 232 students in 6th grade, and 
Medford Memorial Middle School with 600 students in grades 7–8.

Public school students in ninth through twelfth grades attend Shawnee High School, located in Medford Township, which serves students in ninth through twelfth grade from both Medford Lakes and Medford Township. The school is part of the Lenape Regional High School District, which also serves students from Evesham Township, Mount Laurel Township, Shamong Township, Southampton Township, Tabernacle Township and Woodland Township. As of the 2020–21 school year, the high school had an enrollment of 1,576 students and 122.0 classroom teachers (on an FTE basis), for a student–teacher ratio of 12.9:1. Seats on the high school district's 11-member board of education are allocated based on the population of the constituent municipalities, with two seats assigned to Medford.

Burlington County Institute of Technology is a countywide public vocational-technical school district serving students throughout Burlington County, with campuses in Medford and Westampton. As of the 2018–19 school year, the high school had an enrollment of 837 students and 62.5 classroom teachers (on an FTE basis), for a student–teacher ratio of 13.4:1.

Established in 1954, St. Mary of the Lakes School is a Catholic school that serves students in Pre-K through eighth grade, operated under the auspices of the Roman Catholic Diocese of Trenton.

Transportation

Roads and highways

Major roads in Medford include Route 70, County Road 532, County Road 541, and County Road 544.

Public transportation
NJ Transit used to provide bus service to and from Philadelphia on the 406 bus route which ended in Evesham Township but has been discontinued. Greyhound Lines provides nationwide service from nearby Mount Laurel.

The Flying W Airport, a public-use airport, is located in Medford near the border with Lumberton Township.

Notable people

People who were born in, residents of, or otherwise closely associated with Medford include:
 Brenden Aaronson (born 2000), professional soccer midfielder for Leeds United of the English Premier League and the United States men's national soccer team
 David Akers (born 1974), former placekicker for the Philadelphia Eagles
 Martha W. Bark (1928–2015), former member of the New Jersey Senate and General Assembly, who served as Mayor of Medford in 1981 and 1985
 Brandon Brooks (born 1989), formerly the right guard for Philadelphia Eagles
 Angelo Cataldi (born 1951) is a sports radio personality for 94.1 WIP in Philadelphia
 Brian Clarhaut (born 1986), soccer coach
 Charles Dwight Curtiss (1887–1983), Administrator of the Federal Highway Administration from 1955 to 1957
 Jarret DeHart (born 1994), assistant hitting coach for the Seattle Mariners
 Harry Ekman (1923–1999), graphic artist best known for his pin-up and advertising work, specifically with Gil Elvgren
 Calista Flockhart (born 1964), actress best known for her title role as Ally McBeal
 Jamie Franks (born 1986), professional soccer player
 Ron Gassert (born 1940), former NFL defensive tackle who played for two seasons with the Green Bay Packers
 Michael Hartmann (born 1994), professional soccer player who plays as a goalkeeper for FC Haka in the Veikkausliiga
 Ryan Heins (born 1985), retired soccer defender and midfielder
 James Hunter III (1916–1989), judge of the United States Court of Appeals for the Third Circuit
 Kelli James (born 1970), former field hockey striker who earned a total number of 144 caps for the United States women's national field hockey team
 Ron Jaworski (born 1951), former NFL quarterback and current analyst on ESPN
 Stephen King (born 1986), soccer player for the D.C. United
 Jason Knapp, sportscaster for the CBS Sports Network
 C. Harry Knowles (1928–2020), physicist, entrepreneur, philanthropist, and a prolific inventor who held some 400 patents
 Carl Lewis (born 1961), athlete and winner of nine Olympic gold medals
 Ryan Maki (born 1985), hockey right winger
 Robert J. Meyer (1935–1984), politician who served in the New Jersey General Assembly from the 8th Legislative District from 1982 until his death in 1984
 Kenneth G. Miller (born 1956), geologist at Rutgers University who has written and lectured on global warming and sea level change
 Chauncey Morehouse (1902–1980), jazz drummer
 Chris Myers (born 1965), former mayor of Meford who resigned from the Township Council in December 2011
 Ted Nash (1932–2021), competition rower and Olympic champion, rowing coach, and sports administrator                             
 Mike Posma (born 1967), former professional ice hockey player and head coach 
 Rebecca Quick (born 1972), television journalist/newscaster and co-anchorwoman of CNBC's financial news show Squawk Box
 Scott Rudder (born 1969), former mayor of Medford who represented the 8th Legislative District in the New Jersey General Assembly
 Dee Dee Sharp (born 1945), R & B singer whose hits included Billboard #2 "Mashed Potato Time"
 Tom Simcox (born 1937), film and television actor.
 Don Snow (born 1957), musician best known for his work with the band Squeeze
 Liz Tchou (born 1966), former field hockey defender who was a member of the US women's team that finished fifth at the 1996 Summer Olympics
 Helen Thorpe (born 1963), author and freelance journalist who was the First Lady of Colorado
 Drew Van Acker (born 1986), actor who has appeared in the Pretty Little Liars TV series
 Albert W. Van Duzer (1917–1999), bishop of the Episcopal Diocese of New Jersey, serving from 1973 to 1982
 Mitch Williams (born 1964), former relief pitcher who earned 192 saves in his 11 MLB seasons

References

External links

Medford official website

 
1847 establishments in New Jersey
Faulkner Act (council–manager)
Populated places in the Pine Barrens (New Jersey)
Populated places established in 1847
Townships in Burlington County, New Jersey